The Sogionti or Sogiontii were a Gallic tribe dwelling around present-day Sisteron during the Iron Age.

Name 
They are mentioned as Sogionti (var. songi-, sonti-) by Pliny (1st c. AD), and as Sogionti and Sogion[ti]or(um) on inscriptions. 

The meaning of the name remains obscure. Guy Barruol compared the first element to the toponym Soio.

Geography 
The Sogiontii lived in the middle valley of the Durance river, around present-day Sisteron (Segustero). Their territory was located north of the Reii, west of the Bodiontici, east of the Vocontii, and south of the Sebaginni.

They were probably part of the Vocontian confederation.

History 
They are mentioned by Pliny the Elder as one of the Alpine tribes conquered by Rome in 16–15 BC, and whose name was engraved on the Tropaeum Alpium.

References

Primary sources

Bibliography 

Historical Celtic peoples
Gauls
Tribes of pre-Roman Gaul